Nancy Fahey (born November 3, 1958) is an American retired head women's basketball coach. She coached at the University of Illinois, and she also served as head coach at Washington University in St. Louis. She is a graduate of the University of Wisconsin, where she played college basketball. Fahey was inducted into the Women's Basketball Hall of Fame in 2012.

Coaching career

Johnsburg High School

Fahey began her coaching career shortly after graduating from Wisconsin. She was hired as the girls' basketball coach at Johnsburg High School in 1982. Her final two years at the program, she led the Lady Skyhawks to 20-win seasons and regional championships both years.

Washington University

In 1986, Fahey was named as head women's basketball coach at Washington University. She found some success in her first season, going 16-5. The school joined in the newly-created University Athletic Association and competition started in the 1987-1988 season. Washington won the first three and seven of the first eight UAA championships, making the NCAA Division III women's basketball tournament seven of eight years as well. In 1991, despite finishing second in the UAA, Fahey made her first NCAA Tournament run, finishing in fourth place after losing in the Final Four to St. Thomas and the third-place game to Eastern Connecticut. In 1994, the Bears made another deep run into the tournament, this time making the championship game before losing to Capital University.

The 1997-98 season began a new era for Fahey. The Bears went 28-2, winning the national championship over Southern Maine 77-69. The next season, they went an undefeated 30-0, winning the national championship over Saint Benedict 74-65. The next year was much of the same, going 30-0 once again and winning a third straight national championship, this time once again over Southern Maine 79-33. In 2000-01, the team failed to go undefeated, but finished at 28-2 and won their fourth straight national championship over Messiah College 67-45.

Washington won the UAA conference every year from 1997-98 to 2006-07, again going to the national championship game in 2007. However, they lost to DePauw 55-52. The 2007-08 season was the first time the Bears failed to win 20 games in a season since the national championship run, going 19-8 and finishing second in the conference. However, they rebounded the next year, going 26-5 and losing the national championship game to George Fox University 60-53. In 2009-10, the Bears made their fifth national championship run, this time finishing the season at 29-2 and defeating Hope College 65-59 to take home the title. The following year, despite finishing second in the UAA, the team went to the national championship game for the third consecutive year, losing to Amherst 64-55.

Over the next seven seasons, Fahey would lead Washington University to another four conference championships and advance to the quarterfinals twice (in 2015-16 and 2016–17).

After winning her fifth national championship, Fahey became the first NCAA Division III coach to be admitted to the Women's Basketball Hall of Fame in the Class of 2012.

University of Illinois

On March 22, 2017, Fahey was named as head women's basketball coach at the University of Illinois, following former Washington University athletic director Josh Whitman to the school after he left for Illinois the previous year. After five seasons at Illinois, Fahey announced her retirement on March 4, 2022. She stated, "I want to thank all the coaches and staff members I've worked with for the past 40 years, from Johnsburg High School and Washington University to the University of Illinois. A special thanks to all my players who will always have a special place in my heart. I wish Illinois women's basketball the very best in the future. I'm ready for the next chapter in my life."

Head coaching record

Sources:

References 

1958 births
Living people
Basketball coaches from Wisconsin
Basketball players from Wisconsin
High school basketball coaches in Illinois
Illinois Fighting Illini women's basketball coaches
People from Belleville, Wisconsin
Wisconsin Badgers women's basketball players
University of Wisconsin–Madison alumni
Washington University Bears coaches